Tabassum Ferdous Shaon (born c. 1979) is a Bangladeshi model and beauty pageant titleholder who was crowned Miss Bangladesh 2001. She represented Bangladesh at the 51st Miss World beauty pageant held in Sun City, South Africa on 16 November 2001. Shaon was selected by local tabloid Manab Zamin and London Link Promotion as Miss Bangladesh.

References 

Living people
1970s births
Miss World 2001 delegates
Bangladeshi beauty pageant winners